Kirk Sandall is an outer suburb of Doncaster, located around  north-east of the city centre in the English county of South Yorkshire.

It is served by Kirk Sandall railway station.

See also
Listed buildings in Barnby Dun with Kirk Sandall
The Church of the Good Shepherd, Kirk Sandall and Edenthorpe

External links 
 Kirk Sandall Infants School
 Kirk Sandall Junior School
 10th Doncaster Scout Group (Kirk Sandall & Barnby Dun)

Villages in Doncaster